Champions League 2010 may refer to:
 2010 AFC Champions League
 2010 CAF Champions League
 2009–10 UEFA Champions League
 2010–11 UEFA Champions League
 2009–10 CONCACAF Champions League
 2010–11 CONCACAF Champions League
 2010 Champions League Twenty20